Paul A. Cohen (Chinese name: , born June 2, 1934 Great Neck, New York) is Edith Stix Wasserman Professor of Asian Studies and History Emeritus at Wellesley College and Associate of the Fairbank Center for Chinese Studies, Harvard University. His research interests include 19th-20th century China; historical thought; American historiography on China.

Cohen is the author of influential books on modern Chinese history, as well as historiography, such as Discovering History in China (1984; 2010). His works have been translated into several languages including Chinese and Japanese.

Biography
Paul A. Cohen studied at Cornell University from 1952-1953, before he transferred to the University of Chicago, where he received his BA in 1955. He received his MA in 1957 and PhD in 1961 from Harvard University, where he was a student of John King Fairbank and Benjamin I. Schwartz. After completing his doctorate, he worked at the University of Michigan from 1962 to 1963.  He was a faculty member in the History department at Amherst College from 1963-1965. Thereafter, he taught at Wellesley College till his retirement. He is currently an Associate of the Fairbank Center for Chinese Studies at Harvard University. He was formerly married to Jane M. Cohen, now on the faculty at the University of Texas School of Law in Austin.

Selected publications
 China and Christianity: The Missionary Movement and the Growth of Chinese Antiforeignism, 1860-1870 Cambridge: Harvard University Press, 1963.
 Between Tradition and Modernity: Wang T’ao and Reform in Late Ch’ing China Cambridge: Harvard University Press, 1974.
 Discovering History in China: American Historical Writing on the Recent Chinese Past. New York: Columbia University Press, 1984.
 History in Three Keys: The Boxers as Event, Experience, and Myth. New York: Columbia University Press, 1997.
 Winner of the 1997 John K. Fairbank Prize in East Asian History and the 1997 New England Historical Book Award.
 China Unbound: Evolving Perspectives on the Chinese Past. London; New York: RoutledgeCurzon, 2003.
 Speaking to History: The Story of King Goujian in Twentieth-Century China. Berkeley: University of California Press, 2009.
 History and Popular Memory: The Power of Story in Moments of Crisis. New York: Columbia University Press, 2017.

External links
Fairbank Center for Chinese Studies

References

American sinologists
Historians of China
21st-century American historians
21st-century American male writers
Living people
University of Michigan faculty
Harvard University alumni
University of Chicago alumni
Cornell University alumni
Year of birth missing (living people)
American male non-fiction writers